Zagheh-ye Sofla (also Romanized as Zāgheh-ye Soflá; also known as Zāgheh and Zāgheh-ye Pā’īn) is a village in Kowleh Rural District, Saral District, Divandarreh County, Kurdistan Province, Iran. At the 2006 census, its population was 459, in 111 families. The village is populated by Kurds.

References 

Towns and villages in Divandarreh County
Kurdish settlements in Kurdistan Province